The Lexington Club, often referred to as The Lex, was a dive bar, primarily catered towards queer women, in the Mission District in the American city of San Francisco, California. It was recognized as one of the central landmarks for LGBTQ culture, especially for lesbians and queer women, in San Francisco. The club was founded in 1997 and closed at the end of April 2015.

History 
The Lexington Club was opened in 1997 by Lila Thirkield as a response to the numerous options for gay men but lack of options for lesbians and other queer women in San Francisco. She noticed that 16th and Mission had a "significant dyke presence" there and decided that it would make a good spot for her lesbian-owned business. Other such businesses and services in the area catering to queer women included The Women's Building, the Osento bathhouse, Old Wives Tales bookstore, and Amelia's bar, which had closed in 1991. The Lexington's site had previously housed a Mexican bar, Sunset.

In October 2014, Thirkield announced that she would sell the Lexington Club and close the establishment in 2015. Thirkield cited rising rent and the changing neighborhood as factors behind her decision to sell, specifically the decline of LGBT patrons residing in the area that made the business unsustainable. She is a co-owner of another bar in the Mission, Virgil's Sea Room. In February 2015, she announced that the Lexington Club would close at the end of April, and that she sold the bar to the PlumpJack Group. The space is now a bar called Wildhawk.

Closing and response 
The bar closed on April 30, 2015, the last remaining lesbian bar in San Francisco. Community members, including the GLBT Historical Society and Supervisor David Campos, initiated a fundraiser for a commemorative plaque. It was unveiled in a ceremony on September 19, 2016.

The Lexington Club Archival Project was started by two filmmakers, Susie Smith and Lauren Tabak, in early 2015. The project's mission is stated on their website as: "dedicated to documenting the stories, sounds and images from San Francisco's last full-time lesbian bar, which closed April 30th 2015." The San Francisco International Film Festival screened a short version of the project's work-in-progress documentary film Never a Cover on April 30, 2015. As of September 2015, the project was continuing work on the feature-length documentary and had raised $20,656 in a Kickstarter project.

Culture 

Michelle Tea's book Valencia, which takes place in the Mission District of San Francisco, mentions the Lexington Club. This book has been adapted into a film. Other movies that have featured or been set in the Lexington Club include Ashley 22, How to Pick Up Girls, By Hook or By Crook, The Wild Search, Mechanic's Daydream, Getting Off, and Lit.

See also

 Amelia's
 Maud's
 Mona's 440 Club
 Peg's Place
Wild Side West

References

External links 
 LocalWiki: Lexington Club
 NYTimes: Spotlight on the Gay Community Today: Lila Thirkield
 SF Weekly: The Lexington Club Is Closing Because the Mission Has "Dramatically Changed"

1997 establishments in California
2015 disestablishments in California
Bars (establishments)
Lesbian culture in California
Lesbian history
LGBT culture in San Francisco
Defunct LGBT nightclubs in California
Mission District, San Francisco
Nightclubs in San Francisco